Ève Henriette Brossin de Mère de Polanska (Blanska) (1878–1954) was a French/Swiss painter.

She was born on July 14, 1878, in Kharkiv, Ukraine. A naturalized Swiss citizen, she died in 1954 in Zurich, Switzerland. 

In 1920 Brossin represented France in the art competitions of the Olympic Games winning a silver medal for work "L'élan" ("The Jump"). (That year, art competitions were held as part of the 1920 Summer Olympics in Antwerp, Belgium. Medals were awarded in five categories (architecture, literature, music, painting, and sculpture), for works inspired by sport-related themes.)

References

External links
 

1878 births
1954 deaths
Olympic silver medalists in art competitions
Medalists at the 1920 Summer Olympics
Olympic competitors in art competitions
Art competitors at the 1920 Summer Olympics
Emigrants from the Russian Empire to Switzerland